William Christopher Champlin (born April 24, 1983) is an American singer-songwriter, best known for his appearance on Season 5 of the NBC singing competition The Voice as part of Adam Levine's team. He finished in third place behind Jacquie Lee, the runner-up, and Tessanne Chin, the winner of the season.

Career
Before his participation on The Voice, Champlin reached some success as a songwriter. He collaborated with Michael Caruso and provided backing vocals for Ace Young's self-titled album, and also played piano on Michael Jackson's posthumous compilation album Michael, on the song "(I Like) The Way You Love Me". He was nominated in the Best Contemporary R&B Gospel Album category, for co-writing "Ordinary Me", which appears on Heather Headley's album Audience of One. Audience of One was awarded the 2010 Grammy in its category.

He is now the lead singer of the gritty rock band Valley of Wolves. They made their debut in 2018 with the release of the Album 'Out for Blood'. In 2019 they released 'Take it All'  and in 2021 'Outlaws' was released.

The Voice
On the fourth episode of the Blind Auditions broadcast on October 1, 2013, he performed Gavin DeGraw's song "Not Over You". Adam Levine, Cee Lo Green, and Blake Shelton turned their chairs but he opted to join Adam Levine.

In the Battle Rounds, Wolpert won, and Champlin was stolen by Aguilera. In the Knockout Rounds, Schuler won, and Champlin was then stolen back from Aguilera by Levine.

 – Studio version of performance reached the top 10 on iTunes

Personal life
Champlin was born and raised in Los Angeles, California. He is the youngest son of Bill Champlin, former member of Chicago, and Tamara Champlin. He graduated from the Berklee College of Music in Boston, Massachusetts. He has one daughter, Harper.

Discography

Studio albums

Singles

Guest appearances

Releases from The Voice

References

External links
Will Champlin on Twitter
Will Champlin Interview – NAMM Oral History Library (2016)

1983 births
Living people
21st-century American singers
The Voice (franchise) contestants
People from Reseda, Los Angeles
21st-century American male singers